Câmpu Mare may refer to several villages in Romania:

 Câmpu Mare, a village in Scoarța Commune, Gorj County
 Câmpu Mare, a village in Bala, Mehedinți
 Câmpu Mare, a village in Dobroteasa Commune, Olt County

See also 
 Câmpia (disambiguation)
 Câmpeni (disambiguation)
 Câmpulung (disambiguation)
 Câmpu River (disambiguation)